Annexation of Puerto Rico may refer to:

The culmination of the Puerto Rican Campaign, ratified at the Treaty of Paris
A football play in the 1994 film Little Giants, more commonly known as a fumblerooski
A single from the eponymous 2006 album by A Static Lullaby